Minto is a town in midwestern Ontario, Canada, on the Maitland River in Wellington County.  Minto is the western terminus of Highway 9. It is named for Gilbert Elliot-Murray-Kynynmound, 4th Earl of Minto; 8th Governor General of Canada.

The Town of Minto was formed in 1999 through the amalgamation of the Township of Minto, the Towns of Harriston and Palmerston, along with the Village of Clifford.

Communities
In addition to the primary settlement of Palmerston, the town also includes the smaller communities of Clifford, Cotswold, Drew, Fultons, Glenlee, Greenbush, Harriston, Harriston Junction, Minto, Teviotdale and White's Junction.

Note:

Demographics

Sports
Mapleton-Minto 81's SR. AA hockey team playing in the Western Ontario Athletic Association.

Education
Minto's schools are governed by the Upper Grand District School Board.
 Palmerston Public School (grades JK–8) – mascot: Panda
 Minto Clifford Central Public School (grades JK–8) – mascot: Tornado
 Norwell District Secondary School (grades 9–12) – mascot: Redmen

See also
List of townships in Ontario
Minto flywheel facility

References

External links

Towns in Ontario
Lower-tier municipalities in Ontario
Municipalities in Wellington County, Ontario